Metarctia priscilla is a moth of the subfamily Arctiinae. It was described by Sergius G. Kiriakoff in 1957. It is found in Ghana and Guinea.

References

 

Metarctia
Moths described in 1957